Samuele Birindelli (born 19 July 1999) is an Italian professional footballer who plays as a right-back for  club Monza.

Club career
Coming through the youth system, Birindelli made his professional debut for Pisa in the Coppa Italia, the Italian national cup, on 29 November 2016, in a game against Torino.

On 7 July 2022, Birindelli signed for newly-promoted Serie A side Monza on a four-year contract. He made his debut on 8 August, in a 3–2 Coppa Italia win against Frosinone. Birindelli's first Serie A game came on 13 August, as a starter in a 2–1 home defeat to Torino.

International career
On 13 October 2020, Birindelli made his debut with Italy U21 as a starter in a qualifying match for the 2021 UEFA European Under-21 Championship won 2–0 against the Republic of Ireland in Pisa, Italy.

Personal life
Samuele is the son of former footballer Alessandro Birindelli.

Career statistics

Club

References

External links
 
 
 
 Samuele Birindelli A.C. Monza profile 

1999 births
Living people
Sportspeople from Pisa
Footballers from Tuscany
Italian footballers
Association football fullbacks
Pisa S.C. players
A.C. Monza players
Serie B players
Serie C players
Serie A players
Italy youth international footballers
Italy under-21 international footballers